Peroxiredoxin-5 (PRDX5), mitochondrial is a protein that in humans is encoded by the PRDX5 gene, located on chromosome 11. 
This gene encodes a member of the six-member peroxiredoxin family of antioxidant enzymes. Like the other five members, PRDX5 is widely expressed in tissues but differs by its large subcellular distribution. In human cells, it has been shown that PRDX5 can be localized to mitochondria, peroxisomes, the cytosol, and the nucleus. Human PRDX5 is identified by virtue of the sequence homologies to yeast peroxisomal antioxidant enzyme PMP20.

Biochemically, PRDX5 is a peroxidase that can use cytosolic or mitochondrial thioredoxins to reduce alkyl hydroperoxides or peroxynitrite with high rate constants in the 106 to 107 M−1s−1 range, whereas its reaction with hydrogen peroxide is more modest, in the 105 M−1s−1 range. So far, PRDX5 has been shown to be a cytoprotective antioxidant enzyme that inhibits endogenous or exogenous peroxide accumulation.

Structure

According to its amino acid sequence, this 2-Cys peroxiredoxin, PRDX5, is the most divergent isoform among mammalian peroxiredoxins, processing only 28% to 30% sequence identity with typical 2-Cys and 1-Cys peroxiredoxins. The divergent amino acid sequence of this atypical peroxiredoxin is reflected in its unique crystal structure. The typical peroxiredoxin is composed of a thioredoxin domain and a C-terminal, whereas PRDX5 has an N-terminal domain and a unique alpha helix replaces a loop structure in the typical thioredoxin domain. In addition, typical 2-Cys or 1-Cys peroxiredoxins are associated as anti-parallel dimers via linkage of two beta-7-strands, whereas a PRDX5 dimer is formed by close contact between an alpha-3-helix of one molecule and an alpha-5-helix from the other molecule.

Function 
As a peroxiredoxin, PRDX5 has antioxidative and cytoprotective functions during oxidative stress. Overexpression of human PRDX5 has been shown to inhibit peroxide accumulation induced by TNF-alpha, PDGF, and p53 in NIH3T3 and HeLa cells and reduce cell death by exogenous peroxide in multiple organelles of CHO, HT-22, and human tendon cells. Meanwhile, reduced expression of PRDX5 induces cell susceptibility to oxidative damage and etoposide, doxorubicin, MPP+, and peroxide-induced apoptosis. In addition, expressing human PRDX5 in other organisms or tissues such as yeast, mouse brain, and Xenopus embryos also leads to protection against oxidative stress. PRDX5 in Drosophila melanogaster has been shown to promote longevity in addition to antioxidant activity.

Clinical significance
By examining 98 stroke patients, Kunze et al. showed an inverse correlation between stroke progression and PRDX5 concentration, suggesting that plasma PRDX5 can be a potential biomarker of inflammation in acute stroke. In human breast cancer cells, knockdown of transcription factor, GATA1, led to increased expression of PRDX5 and inhibition of apoptosis. A substantial increase in PRDX5 expression has been observed in astrocytes in multiple sclerosis lesion. PRDX5 has also been identified as a candidate risk gene for the inflammatory disease, sarcoidosis.

Interactions 

Transcription factor GATA-binding protein 1 can bind to the PRDX5 gene and lead to increased expression of PRDX5. PRDX5 has been shown to physically interact with PRDX1, PRDX2, PRDX6, SOD1, and PARK7 in at least two independent high-throughput proteomic analyses.

References

Further reading